Keybeats is an American songwriting, production, and instrumentalist duo that formed in 1997 and moved from California to New York to work with Timbaland's production outfit in the late 1990s. Comprised of drummer Eric Seats and producer Rapture Stewart, the duo is best known for co-writing and producing Aaliyah's "Rock the Boat", ending up with eight written and produced tracks on her eponymous 2001 Aaliyah album.  Keybeats has also worked with Destiny's Child, Tank, and 702, and placed records onto several movie soundtracks.  Their contributions to "Rock The Boat" were utilized on Kanye West's "Fade" and The Weeknd's "What You Need" from his early House of Balloons project.

Songwriting and production credits

Credits are courtesy of Discogs, Tidal, Apple Music, and AllMusic. 

‹› Eric Seats Co-writes/Productions

«» Rapture Stewart Co-writes/Productions

Awards and nominations

References 

African-American songwriters
American hip hop record producers
African-American record producers